Kovalan is a central character in Ilango Adigal's Silappatikaram, one of the ancient Tamil epics.

Family
Father : Machattuvan
Wife   : Kannagi 
Lover  : Madhavi 
Daughter : Manimekalai (Mother: Madhavi)

Narrative
Puharkkandam

Kovalan, the son of a wealthy merchant, Machattuvan, married Kannagi, the daughter of another merchant, Manayakan. At the time of his marriage, he was sixteen years old. They lived together happily in the city of Kaveripattinam, until Kovalan met the courtesan Madhavi and fell in love with her. In his infatuation, he completely forgot his wife and spent his time and parental wealth with Madhavi.

During the annual festival in the honour of Indra, there was a misunderstanding between Kovalan and Madhavi. As a result, the penniless Kovalan returned to Kannagi, who welcomed him whole-heartedly. Realising his mistake, he decided to start a new life by migrating to Madurai with Kannagi. Accompanied by a Buddhist nun, they started their journey towards Madurai city at the stroke of first light.

Maduraikkandam

After many days, they reached the city of Madurai. In the middle of the journey, Kovalan sent word to his parents about his intentions of starting a new life in a new city. Upon arrival, impressed by the grandeur of Madurai city, Kovalan set out to sell one of Kannagi's anklets (Tamil: Silambu), the only left-over asset they owned, with which he intended to start a business. Kovalan entrusted the anklet to be sold to the palace's chief jeweller, who promises to fetch him good money from King Nedunjeliyan I. The king, who is tricked by the chief Jeweller, ordered to behead Kovalan without a trial, on account of stealing the Queen's anklet. Thereby, Kovalan dies in the city of Madurai.

In films

References

Further reading
 The Silappatikaram of Ilanko Atigal: An Epic of South India (Translations from the Asian Classics) by R. Parthasarathy (1992)
 An Introduction to Cilappathikaram
 Cilapathikaram in Tamil Unicode - pukaark kaaNtam, maturaik kANTam, vanjcik kANTam

Characters in Silappatikaram